Mesophleps tephrastis is a moth of the family Gelechiidae. It is found in Australia (Western Australia).

References

Moths described in 1927
Mesophleps